Longchaeus suturalis, common name the crenulated pyram, is a species of sea snail, a marine gastropod mollusk in the family Pyramidellidae, the pyrams and their allies.

Description
The shell size varies between 7 mm and 14 mm.

Distribution
This species occurs in the following locations:
 Gulf of Mexico (Virgin Islands)
 the Caribbean Sea off Venezuela and Colombia
 the Atlantic Ocean off North Carolina

References

External links
 To Encyclopedia of Life
 To World Register of Marine Species
 

Pyramidellidae
Gastropods described in 1843